Huang Ming (born April 1963) is a general (shangjiang) of the People's Liberation Army (PLA). He has been serving as commander of the Central Theater Command since January 2023. He prevoiusly served as chief of staff of the People's Liberation Army Ground Force from September 2021 to January 2023, and formerly served as commander of the 81st Group Army. 

Huang is a member of the 20th Central Committee of the Communist Party of China. He was also a delegate to the 13th National People's Congress.

Biography
Huang was born in  Yixing, Jiangsu in 1963. He enlisted in the People's Liberation Army (PLA) in 1980, after high school. He served as chief of staff of the 78th Group Army before serving as commander of the 75th Group Army. In March 2017 he was appointed commander of the 81st Group Army, and held that office until June 2019, when he was promoted to become deputy commander of the People's Liberation Army Ground Force.

He was promoted to the rank of major general (shaojiang) in July 2014, lieutenant general (zhongjiang) in December 2019. and general (shangjiang) in January 2023.

References

1963 births
People from Yixing
Living people
People's Liberation Army generals from Jiangsu
Members of the 20th Central Committee of the Chinese Communist Party